The Texelspitze is the second highest mountain in the Texel group (Gruppo di Tessa) of the Ötztal Alps. The highest mountain of this group is Roteck which is 19m higher.

References

Mountains of South Tyrol
Mountains of the Alps
Alpine three-thousanders
Ötztal Alps